Nyssiodes is a genus of moth in the family Geometridae.

Species
Nyssiodes koreanus Kemal & Kocak, 2004 (=Nyssiodes ochraceus Kim & Shin, 1995)
Nyssiodes lefuarius (Erschoff, 1872)
Nyssiodes ochraceus Wehrli, 1923
Nyssiodes rhodopolitis Wehrli, 1939

Status unclear
Nyssiodes perochrea Wehrli, 1941 (Nomen nudum)

References
Natural History Museum Lepidoptera genus database

Bistonini